General elections were held in Honduras on November 29, 1981. Each voter had a single vote to cast for a presidential candidate, with seats in the National Congress divided based on the share of the vote their presidential candidate had won. The result was a victory for Roberto Suazo Cordova and the Liberal Party. Voter turnout was 78.5%.

Results

References

Elections in Honduras
1981 in Honduras
Honduras
Presidential elections in Honduras
November 1981 events in North America